= Revue de Médecine Interne =

- Discipline: Internal medicine
- Language: French
- Edited by: Jacques Pouchot

Publication details
- History: 1980–present
- Publisher: Elsevier on behalf of the Société Nationale Française de Médecine Interne (France)
- Frequency: Monthly
- Impact factor: 0.614 (2011)

Standard abbreviations
- ISO 4: Rev. Méd. Interne

Indexing
- CODEN: RMEIDE
- ISSN: 0248-8663
- OCLC no.: 7373286

Links
- Journal homepage; Online access

The Revue de Médecine Interne is a French medical journal that covers research in internal medicine. It is the official journal of the Société Nationale Française de Médecine Interne (English: French National Society of Internal Medicine). The current editor-in-chief is Jacques Pouchot. According to the Journal Citation Reports, the journal has a 2011 impact factor of 0.614.
